Reconnaissance is exploration conducted to gain information. 

Reconnaissance may also refer to:
 Reconnaissance (military), the active seeking to determine a foe's intentions by collecting and gathering information about an enemy's composition and capabilities along with pertinent environmental conditions
 Reconnaissance (rallying), observation of racetrack prior to rally motorsport races
 Network Reconnaissance, an "exploration or enumeration of network infrastructure including network addresses, available communication ports, and available services"
 Reconnaissance, a 2015 poetry collection by Carl Phillips

See also 
 Recce (disambiguation)
 Renaissance (disambiguation)